Payton Anthony Henry (born June 24, 1997) is an American professional baseball catcher for the Milwaukee Brewers of Major League Baseball (MLB). He made his MLB debut in 2021 with the Miami Marlins.

Amateur career
Henry attended Pleasant Grove High School in Pleasant Grove, Utah. He originally committed to play college baseball at the University of Nevada, Las Vegas. But he decommitted during his junior year. He later committed to Brigham Young University. As a junior in 2015, he hit .527 with nine home runs, and was named the Gatorade Player of the Year for the state of Utah. In 2016, his senior year, he batted .519 with seven home runs alongside pitching to a 2.91 ERA, earning Utah Gatorade Player of the Year honors for the second straight season. After the season, he was selected by the Milwaukee Brewers in the sixth round of the 2016 Major League Baseball draft. He signed with the Brewers for $550,000.

Professional career

Milwaukee Brewers organization
Henry made his professional debut after signing with the Rookie-level Arizona League Brewers, hitting .256 with 17 RBIs over 24 games. 

In 2017, Henry played with the Helena Brewers of the Rookie-level Pioneer League where he batted .242 with seven home runs and 33 RBIS over 55 games. He spent the 2018 season with the Wisconsin Timber Rattlers of the Class A Midwest League, with whom he was named an All-Star and slashed .234/.327/.380 with ten home runs and 41 RBIs over 98 games. He was awarded a Gold Glove after the season. In 2019, he spent the year with the Carolina Mudcats of the Class A-Advanced Carolina League, earning All-Star honors and batting .242/.315/.395 with 14 home runs and 75 RBIs over 121 games, as he led the league in double plays grounded into with 18, and was third in strikeouts, with 142.

Henry did not play a minor league game in 2020, due to the cancellation of the minor league season caused by the COVID-19 pandemic. He was not added to Milwaukee's 40-man roster. He was eligible for the 2020 Rule 5 draft, but was not selected. 

To begin the 2021 season, he was assigned to the Biloxi Shuckers of the Double-A South, with whom he batted .188. In mid-June, he was promoted to the Nashville Sounds of the Triple-A East.

Miami Marlins
On July 30, 2021, Henry was traded to the Miami Marlins in exchange for John Curtiss. He was then assigned to the Jacksonville Jumbo Shrimp of the Triple-A East. Over 71 games with Biloxi, Nashville, and Jacksonville, Henry hit .266/.351/.390 with six home runs and 27 RBIs.

On September 17, Miami selected Henry's contract and promoted him to the active roster to make his MLB debut that night. He started at catcher and collected one hit, a double, over four at-bats versus the Pittsburgh Pirates. Henry had 15 at-bats for the Marlins in 2021 in which he collected four hits.

Milwaukee Brewers
On November 10, 2022, Henry was traded to the Milwaukee Brewers in exchange for outfielder Reminton Batista.

Personal life
Henry is a member of the Church of Jesus Christ of Latter-day Saints.

References

External links

1997 births
Living people
Latter Day Saints from Utah
People from American Fork, Utah
Baseball players from Utah
Major League Baseball catchers
Miami Marlins players
Arizona League Brewers players
Helena Brewers players
Wisconsin Timber Rattlers players
Carolina Mudcats players
Biloxi Shuckers players
Nashville Sounds players
Jacksonville Jumbo Shrimp players